Ulceby railway station serves the village of Ulceby, North Lincolnshire near Immingham in North East Lincolnshire, England. It was built by the Great Grimsby and Sheffield Junction Railway in 1848 and is located at Ulceby Skitter.

It is managed by East Midlands Railway and served by its trains on the Barton line between Cleethorpes and Barton-on-Humber.

The station layout is somewhat unusual in that all passenger trains use a single platform, even though the station is located on a double track line. These junctions, and the adjacent level crossing were controlled from Ulceby Junction signal box at the southern end of the station, however this was demolished in January 2016 when the crossing and signals were automated. The station originally had two platforms but this was altered to a single wooden platform when the line was resignalled in the 1980s.

Services
All services at Ulceby are operated by East Midlands Railway using Class 156 DMUs.

There is a Sunday service of four trains per day in each direction during the summer months only. There are no winter Sunday services at the station.

Services were previously operated by Northern Trains but transferred to East Midlands Railway as part of the May 2021 timetable changes.

References
References

Sources

External links

Railway stations in the Borough of North Lincolnshire
DfT Category F2 stations
Former Great Central Railway stations
Railway stations in Great Britain opened in 1848
Railway stations served by East Midlands Railway
Former Northern franchise railway stations